Joachim Carcela-Gonzalez (born 16 December 1999) is a Belgian professional footballer who plays as a midfielder for Belgian First Division B club Deinze.

Club career
On 6 June 2019, Carcela signed his first professional contract with Standard Liège. Carcela made his professional debut for Standard Liège in a 2-0 Belgian First Division A win over Waasland-Beveren on 30 October 2019. He finished his two seasons with Standard Liège with only 2 league appearances, but he played in 3 games of the 2020–21 UEFA Europa League group stage, appearing in both games against Benfica and the away game against Lech Poznań.

On 29 July 2021, he signed a two-year contract with Mouscron. On 2 October 2021, he scored his first professional goal, opening the score in the game against Lierse Kempenzonen in the 1st minute of the game. He also received his first red card in the same game, in the 87th minute, for a serious foul.

Personal life
Carcela was born in Belgium and is Spanish descent. Carcela is the cousin of the Moroccan international footballer, Mehdi Carcela.

References

External links

1999 births
Sportspeople from Ostend
Footballers from West Flanders
Belgian people of Spanish descent
Living people
Belgian footballers
Association football midfielders
Standard Liège players
R.S.C. Anderlecht players
Club Brugge KV players
Royal Excel Mouscron players
K.M.S.K. Deinze players
Belgian Pro League players
Challenger Pro League players